Laëtitia Roux  (born 21 June 1985) is a French ski mountaineer.

Roux was born in Savines-le-Lac and started ski-mountaineering at the age of nine. In autumn of 2005, she joined the PACA section of the Fédération française de la montagne et de l’escalade (FFME). She competed in December of the same year at the Alpi-Champsaur race. Roux is member of the Team Ecrins Hautes-Alpes and the international Dynafit team. She has been a member of the French national selection since 2007 and lives in Grenoble.

Selected results
 2006:
 9th, World Championship vertical race
 2007:
 1st, European Championship vertical race
 1st, European Championship single race
 1st, Tour du Rutor (together with Gloriana Pellissier)
 2nd, European Championship relay race (together with Corinne Favre and Véronique Lathuraz)
 2008:
 1st, World Cup race in Massongex
 2nd, World Championship single race
 8th, European Championship vertical race
 2009:
 1st, Valtellina Orobie World Cup race
 1st, Dachstein Xtreme
 3rd, European Championship relay race (together with Véronique Lathuraz and Corinne Favre)
 4th, European Championship vertical race
 7th, European Championship single race
 2010:
 1st, World Championship single race
 2nd, World Championship vertical race
 4th, World Championship combination ranking
 5th, World Championship relay race (together with Valentine Fabre and Sandrine Favre)
 2011:
 1st, World Championship sprint
 2nd, World Championship single race
 2nd, World Championship vertical race
 2nd, World Championship relay, together with Sandrine and Émilie Favre
 2nd, World Championship vertical, combined ranking
 2012:
 1st, European Championship single
 1st, European Championship vertical race
 3rd, World Championship vertical, combined ranking
 4th, European Championship relay, together with Corinne Favre and Émilie Favre
 1st, Patrouille de la Maya, together with Séverine Pont-Combe and Mireia Miró Varela

Patrouille des Glaciers 

 2006: 4th, together with Marie Troillet and Laëtitia Currat
 2008: 2nd, together with Corinne Favre and Nathalie Bourillon
 2012: 1st, together with Mireia Miró Varela and Séverine Pont-Combe

Pierra Menta 

 2008: 1st, together with Nathalie Etzensperger
 2009: 3rd, together with Véronique Lathuraz
 2010: 2nd, together with Mireia Miró Varela
 2011: 1st, together with Mireia Miró Varela
 2012: 2nd, together with Séverine Pont-Combe
 2017: 1st, together with Emelie Forsberg
 2018: 2nd, together with Emelie Forsberg

Trofeo Mezzalama 

 2009: 1st, together with Francesca Martinelli and Roberta Pedranzini
 2011: 2nd, together with Mireia Miró Varela and Nathalie Etzensperger
 2017: 1st, together with Emelie Forsberg and Jennifer Fiechter

External links
 Laëtitia Roux at www.laetitiaroux.com
 Laëtitia Roux at skimountaineering.org

References

1985 births
Living people
French female ski mountaineers
World ski mountaineering champions
Sportspeople from Hautes-Alpes
French sky runners
Skyrunning World Championships winners
French female long-distance runners
21st-century French women